The Grand prix littéraire d'Afrique noire (one of the major literary prizes of Black Africa for Francophone Literature) is a literary prize presented every year by the ADELF, the Association of French Language Writers for a French original text from Sub-Saharan Africa.
It was originally endowed with 2,000 french francs.

Winners
 1961: Aké Loba (Côte d'Ivoire) for Kocumbo, l'étudiant noir
 1962: Cheikh Hamidou Kane (Senegal) for L'Aventure ambiguë
 1963: Jean Ikelle Matiba (Cameroon) for Cette Afrique-là
 1964: Birago Diop (Senegal) for Contes et Lavanes
 1965: Bernard Dadié (Côte d'Ivoire) for Patron de New-York
 1965: Seydou Badian Kouyaté (Mali) for Les Dirigeants africains face à leurs peuples
 1966: Olympe Bhely-Quenum (Benin) for Le chant du lac
 1967: Francis Bebey (Cameroon) for Le fils d'Agatha Moudio
 1967: Francois Evembe (Cameroon) for Sur la terre en passant
 1967: Jean Pliya (Benin) for Kondo, le requin
 1968: Bernard Dadié (Côte d'Ivoire) for La ville où nul ne meurt
 1968: Francis Bebey (Cameroon) for Le Fils d'Agatha Moudio
 1969: Ahmadou Kourouma (Côte d'Ivoire)  for Les Soleils des indépendances
 1969: Guy Menga (Republic of the Congo) for La Palabre stérile
 1971: Boubou Hama (Niger) for Kotia Nima
 1971: Massa Makan Diabaté (Mali) for Janjon
 1971: L'abbé Mviena (Cameroon) for L'Univers culturel et religieux du peuple Béti
 1972: Henri Lopès (Democratic Republic of Congo) for Tribaliques
 1973: Alioun Fantoure (Guinea) for Le Cercle des tropiques
 1974: Amadou Hampâté Bâ (Mali) for L'étrange destin de Wangrin
 1975: Étienne Yanou (Cameroon) for L'Homme Dieu de Bisso
 1976: Aouta Keita (Mali) for Femmes d'Afrique
 1977: Sory Camara (Guinea) for Gens de la parole: Essai sur les griots malinké
 1978: Idé Oumarou (Niger) for Gros plan
 1979: Lamine Diakhate (Senegal) for Chalys d'Harlem
 1980: Aminata Sow Fall (Senegal) for La grève des Bàttu
 1981: Jean-Marie Adiaffi (Côte d'Ivoire) for La carte d'identité
 1982: Frédéric Titinga Pacéré (Burkino Faso) for La poésie des griots : poèmes pour l'Angola
 1982: Mariama Bâ (Senegal) for Un Chant écarlate
 1982: Yodi Karone (Cameroon) for Nègre de paille
 1983: Sony Labou Tansi (Democratic Republic of the Congo) for L'ante-peuple
 1984: Cheikh Hamidou Kane (Senegal)
 1985: Modibo Sounkalo Keita (Mali) for L'archer bassari
 1985: Edem Kodjo (Togo) for Et demain l'Afrique
 1986: Jean-Pierre Makouta-Mboukou (Congo) for La Critique littéraire
 1986: Bolga Baenga (Congo) for Cannibale
 1986: Tierno Monénembo (Guinea) for Les écailles du ciel
 1987: Jean-Baptiste Tati Loutard (Republic of the Congo) for Le Récit de la mort
 1988: Emmanuel Dongala (Democratic Republic of the Congo) for Le feu des origines
 1989: Victor Bouadjio (France) for Demain est encore loin
 1990: Henri Lopès (Democratic Republic of the Congo)
 1990: Ahmadou Kourouma (Côte d'Ivoire) for  Monnè, outrages et defis
 1991: Amadou Hampâté Bâ (Mali) for Amkullel, l'enfant peul and L'empire peul du Macina
 1991: Kama Sywor Kamanda (Democratic Republic of the Congo) for La nuit des griots
 1992: Patrick Ilboudo (Burkina Faso) for Le héraut têtu
 1993: Maurice Bandaman (Côte d'Ivoire) for Le fils de la femme male
 1994: Calixthe Beyala (Cameroon) for Maman a un amant
 1995: Emmanuel Dongala (Democratic Republic of the Congo)
 1995: Sylvain Ntari-Bemba (Democratic Republic of the Congo) pour Reves portatifs Zaire
 1996: Abdourahman A. Waberi (Djibouti)
 1996: Léopold Sédar Senghor (Senegal) for Anthologie de la nouvelle poesie negre et malgache de langue francaise
 1997: Daniel Biyaoula (Republic of the Congo) for L'impasse
 1998: Gaston-Paul Effa (Cameroon) for Mâ
 1999: Alain Mabanckou (Republic of the Congo) for Bleu-Blanc-Rouge (novel)
 2000: Ken Bugul (Benin) for Riwan ou le chemin de sable
 2001: Kossi Efoui (Togo) for La Fabrique de cérémonies
 2002: Patrice Nganang (Cameroun) for Temps de chien (Le Serpent à Plumes)
 2003: Kangni Alem (Togo) for Cola Cola jazz
 2004: Sami Tchak (Togo) for Littérature et engagement: Mongo Beti, un écrivain conscient de son devoir envers son peuple? and Togoo: la démocratie introuvable
 2005: Véronique Tadjo (Côte d'Ivoire)
 2005: Mahamoudou Ouédraogo (Burkina Faso)
 2006: Edem Awumey (Togo) for Port Mélo
 2007: Bessora (Gabon) for Cueillez-moi jolis Messieurs...
 2008: Jean Divassa Nyama (Gabon) for Vocation de Dignité
 2009: In Koli Jean Bofane for Mathématiques congolaises
 2010: Gabriel Mwéné Okoundji (Republic of the Congo) for L’äme blessée d’un éléphant noir 2011: Léonora Miano (Cameroon) for Blues pour l’Afrique and Ces âmes chagrines 2012: Venance Konan (Côte d'Ivoire) for Edem Kodjo, un homme, un destin 2013: Augustin Emane (Gabon / France) for Docteur Schweitzer, une icône africaine 2014: Eugène Ébodé (Cameroon) for Souveraine magnifique.
 2015: Hemley Boum (Cameroon) for Les maquisards 2016: Blick Bassy (Cameroon) for Le Moabi Cinéma 2017: Aristide Tarnagda (Burkina Faso) for Terre rouge 2018: Timba Bema (Cameroon) for Les seins de l’amante and Armand Gauz (Côte d'Ivoire) for Camarade Papa 2019: Hemley Boum (Cameroon) for Les jours viennent et passent''

References

Awards established in 1961
French-language literary awards
African literary awards
French literary awards